The 1926 All-Missouri Valley Conference football team consists of American football players chosen by various organizations for All-Missouri Valley Conference teams for the 1926 college football season.  The selectors for the 1926 season included the Associated Press (AP).

All-Missouri Valley selections

Ends
 Carl Bacchus, Missouri (AP-1)
 Roland Coe, Iowa State (AP-1)
 Roy LeCrone, Oklahoma (AP-2)
 Chuck Delmege, Drake (AP-2)

Tackles
 Lon Stiner, Nebraska (AP-1)
 Ed Lindenmeyer, Missouri (AP-1)
 Martin, Grinell (AP-2 [also as guard])

Guards
 Harold Weissinger, Oklahoma A&M (AP-1)
 Simon Tombaugh, Kansas State (AP-1)
 Ralph J. Studebaker, Missouri (AP-2)

Centers
 Polly Wallace, Oklahoma (AP-1)
 Lewis Davidson, Kansas (AP-2)

Quarterbacks
 Bert Clark, Missouri (AP-1)
 Gordon Peery, Oklahoma A&M (AP-2)

Halfbacks
 Frank Potts, Oklahoma (AP-1)
 Glenn Presnell, Nebraska (AP-1)
 Joe Holsinger, Kansas State (AP-2)
 Chuck Everett, Drake (AP-2)

Fullbacks
 Gordon "Butch" Meeter, Grinnell (AP-1)
 Blue Howell, Nebraska (AP-2)

Key
AP = Associated Press

See also
 1926 College Football All-America Team

References

All-Missouri Valley Conference football team
All-Big Eight Conference football teams